Brody Raion (translit: Brodivs’kyi raion) was a raion (district) of Lviv Oblast (region) of Western Ukraine. Its administrative center was Brody. The raion was abolished on 18 July 2020 as part of the administrative reform of Ukraine, which reduced the number of raions of Lviv Oblast to seven. The area of Brody Raion was merged into Zolochiv Raion.

The raion was located at the easternmost portion of Lviv Oblast bordering with Rivne and Ternopil Oblasts to its east, Volyn Oblast to the north, Radekhiv Raion to the northwest, Busk Raion to the west, and Zolochiv Raion to the southwest.

Historically, the district (county) became known as border checkpoint between the Austria-Hungary Empire and the Russian Empire. As a county (powiat) it was established in 1866 as part of the Kingdom of Galicia and Lodomeria. After World War I, the area became part of the Second Polish Republic within the Tarnopol Voivodeship. During the invasion of Soviet forces at the beginning of World War II, the district was established by the Soviet administration.

The raion had a city administrative area, a "town with three other villages" administrative area and 23 rural councils which were formed out of the rest of the 73 villages. Some councils included up to 10 villages (Ponykva), while some consisted only of a pair of villages.

Subdivisions
At the time of disestablishment, the raion consisted of three hromadas:
 Brody urban hromada with the administration in Brody;
 Pidkamin settlement hromada with the administration in the urban-type settlement of Pidkamin;
 Zabolottsi rural hromada with the administration in the selo of Zabolottsi.

Landmarks of architecture

 Ruins of the Brody Castle, built by Guillaume Le Vasseur de Beauplan (1630–1635)
 Church of Vozdvyzhenia Chesnoho Khresta (former kosciol, 1660)
 Church of the Nativity of the Virgin Mary (18th century)
 Church of Saint George (18th century)
 Church of Holy Trinity (1750s)
 Ruins of Brody Synagogue (1750s)
 Jewish Cemetery in Brody

 Pidhirtsi Castle, built by Beauplan
 Castle's kosciol
 Inner court with a solar clock
 Castle's garden
 Church of Saint Michael (18th century)
 400-year-old linden tree
 Plisnysko Gord
 Order of Saint Basil Monastery (18th century)

 Monastery UGCC (earlier Dominican Order) (Pidkamin)
 Building of kosciol
 Monastery cells
 Defensive walls and bastions
 Corinth column with a statue of the Virgin Mary
 Several towns chapels
 Dominican cemetery
 17-meter tall rock, leftover of a sea reef
 Wooden kosciol of Yazlivchyk (1930s)
 Potocki Palace in Konyushkiv (18th century)
 Cossack cemetery near Shnyriv (1651)
 Kosciol ruins of the former Order of Saint Bernadine Monastery

Education
 Markian Shashkevych Brody Pedagogical College

Health care
 Brody Central District Hospital
 Pidkamin City Hospital
 Zabolotsi District Hospital
 Dental Clinic

See also
 Administrative divisions of Lviv Oblast

References

1939 establishments in Ukraine
Former raions of Lviv Oblast
States and territories established in 1939
Ukrainian raions abolished during the 2020 administrative reform